The salt extraction process is an electrolytic method which may be used to extract valuable metals from slag, low-grade ores, or other materials by using molten salts. This method was developed by S. Seetharaman, O. Grinder, L. Teng and X. Ge at the Royal Institute of Technology in Sweden as part of a large Steel Eco-Cycle Project in 2005.

Description
In the first step of this process, the slag or other raw materials containing metal values of interest, e.g. chromium, is dissolved into the molten salt phase at a suitable temperature. A suitable flux must be found in order to achieve the dissolution of oxides. According to the Fajans' rules, AlCl3, as a covalent metal chloride, is able to release chloride ions, which then can effectively break the chemical bonds between metal and oxygen atoms, leading to the formation of corresponding soluble metal chlorides and capture of oxygen in Al2O3.  AlCl3 was proved indeed to be a powerful fluxing agent in this regard.

In the second step, the salt phase is subjected to electrolysis in order to recover the metal of interest as a cathode deposit. The salt melt used for extraction can be recycled. The metals can be selectively electrodeposited from the salt melt. There is also the option of aqueous processing of the salt phase containing the metal values. The process can design to be continuous by combining the two steps. The anode off-gas from electrolysis, Cl2 can be reused for accentuating the dissolution of the raw materials. On the other hand, the residue after processing, which consists essentially of Al2O3, can safely be used for landfill, building construction or as a raw material for the refractory industry.

Application 
This process had been successfully employed for the recovery of chromium and iron from the electric furnace slag generated from the stainless steelmaking process, or from low-grade chromite ore. It is also extended to extract copper or iron from both copper oxides and sulfides.

The electrochemical behaviors of the metal ions (Cr, Cu, Fe, Mg, Mn) in the molten salts (NaCl-KCl-(CaCl2))with respect to this process were also extensively investigated. Those results are also useful for the industrial electrowinning processes of related metal or alloy production.

References 

Electrolysis
Chemical processes
Extraction (chemistry)